Navigazione Generale Italiana (NGI) was an Italian shipping company.

History
The company formed in 1881 by the merger of I & V. Florio of Palermo and Raffaele Rubattino of Genoa. At the time of the merger, the two companies both operated extensively in the Mediterranean, with I & V Florio also operating routes to the United States and Canada, and Raffele Rubattino operating routes to India and the Far East through the Suez Canal.

The Florio Line brought 50 ships into the merger, while Rubattino contributed 40. Following the merger, the new company not only maintained the existing service, it expanded by adding service to South America in 1884. To support the new routes, in 1885, NGI acquired competitors Società Italiana Trasporti Marittimi Raggio & Co. and Società Rocco Piaggio & Figli.

Società Italiana di Transporti Marittimi Raggio & Co. was founded in Genoa in 1882 by Carlo, Edilio and Armando Raggio to transport passengers and freight between Italy and South America; Società Rocco Piaggio & Figli was formed in Genoa in 1870 and operated routes to Montevideo and Buenos Aires through the Canary Islands, then later between Genoa, Naples, and Rio de la Plata.

In 1901, the company further expanded by acquiring the assets of La Veloce, a shipping company formed in 1884 which was liquidated in 1924 following its acquisition by Navigazione Generale Italiana.

1906 brought another expansion with the acquisition of Italia Società di Navigazione a Vapore, a shipping company founded in Genoa in 1899.

On June 13, 1910, the Società Nazionale dei Servizi Marittimi acquired the NGI's Mediterranean routes allowing NGI to focus on the trans-Atlantic operations with 19 remaining vessels. Also in 1910, NGI acquired Lloyd Italiano, a shipping company started in Genoa in 1904 by Erasmo Piaggio who was pursuing links with North and South America.

In 1932, NGI merged with Lloyd Sabaudo and Cosulich Line to form the Italian Line that later built the one-time Italian Blue Riband champion  and the ill-fated .

Routes
The company's principal routes were those from Italy-US East Coast and Italy-Brazil/Argentina, both strongly underpinned economically by the emigrant trade.

Fleet
Over the decades of its existence the company had quite an extensive fleet. Amongst these were a group of ships named after the Italian royal family and other aristocrats and figures of Roman history. Amongst the largest of these was the MS Augustus (1926) 1927-46 and its sister ship the SS Roma, others included the SS Giulio Cesare 1922-44 and the SS Duilio 1923-43.

Ships of the Navigazione Generale Italiana

Pictures

References

External links
 Italian Steamship Lines History and Ephemera Including NGI GG Archives

Shipping companies of Italy
1881 establishments in Italy
Companies established in 1881
Florio family